Herschel W. Cleveland (born April 7, 1946) is an American politician. He was a member of the Arkansas House of Representatives, serving from 1999 to 2005. He is a member of the Democratic party. He is the superintendent of Western Yell School District.

References

Living people
Democratic Party members of the Arkansas House of Representatives
1946 births
People from Paris, Arkansas